Shubrick may refer to:

 William Shubrick (1790-1874), American naval officer
 USLHT Shubrick (1865), a lighthouse tender in service with the United States Lighthouse Board and United States Revenue Cutter Service from 1857 to 1886
 , various United States Navy ships of the name